
The Sacrilege of Fatal Arms is an album by Devil Doll. It is a reworked, remixed, extended version of their previous release Sacrilegium. It is the original soundtrack to the film of the same name, which was written and directed by Mr. Doctor, the creative force behind Devil Doll.

Track listing

Personnel

Line up
 Mr. Doctor – Vocals
 Francesco Carta – Piano
 Roberto Dani – Drums
 Sasha Olenjuk – Violin
 Bor Zuljan – Guitar
 Davor Klaric – Keyboards
 Michel Fantini Jesurum – Pipe organ

Guests 
 Damir Kamidoullin – Cello
 Matej Kovacic – Accordion
 Paolo Zizich – Duet "Talk Talk" with Mr. Doctor
 Devil Chorus conducted by Marian Bunic, and formed by:
 Paolo Zizich
 Marian Bunic
 Polona Sever
 Beti Strencan
 Breda Bunic
 Gregor Oblak
 Jure Strencan
 Boris Kurent
 Mojca Sojer
 Mr. Doctor

Credits 
 Produced by Mr. Doctor, Jurij Toni & Rob Dani
 Engineered by Jurij Toni
 Assistant Engineer: Borut Berden
 All covers concepts: Mr. Doctor
 Lettering: Mr. Doctor
 Artwork: Mr. Doctor
 Films: G. Paolo Fallani

Devil Doll (Slovenian band) albums
1992 albums
Albums recorded in Slovenia